Two ships of the Royal Fleet Auxiliary were named Pearleaf:

 , a Leaf-class tanker launched in 1916 and scrapped in 1947
 , Leaf-class support tanker launched in 1959 and scrapped in 1993

References

Royal Fleet Auxiliary ship names